Archimedean means of or pertaining to or named in honor of the Greek mathematician Archimedes and may refer to:

Mathematics
Archimedean absolute value
Archimedean circle
Archimedean constant
Archimedean copula
Archimedean field
Archimedean group
Archimedean point
Archimedean property
Archimedean solid
Archimedean spiral
Archimedean tiling

Other uses
Archimedean screw
Claw of Archimedes
The Archimedeans, the mathematical society of the University of Cambridge
Archimedean Dynasty
Archimedean Upper Conservatory

See also
 Archimedes (disambiguation)